Now is the second studio album by Finnish singer Anna Abreu, released in Finland by RCA on October 22, 2008. The album was preceded by the singles "Vinegar" and "Silent Despair" and followed by the release of third and fourth singles "Something About U" and "Come Undone".

The album marked a change of artistic direction for Abreu, featuring several dance-infused songs such as the smash hit "Vinegar" and "Something About U". It spent two consecutive weeks at number one on the Finnish albums chart and was certified platinum for Finnish sales in excess of 30,000 copies. The album spent eighteen weeks on the albums chart and has to date sold over 50,000 copies. It is ranked as the best-selling album of 2008 in Finland.

Commercial performance
Now debuted at number two on the Finnish Top 40 albums chart, selling just under 7000 copies in its first week, considerably less than her debut, which sold almost 30,000 and was certified platinum in its first week alone. In its seventh week however, the album rose up to the top spot, becoming Abreu's second number one album. It held the number one position for two consecutive weeks, gaining further sales of 20,000 copies. In total Now spent eighteen weeks on the official Top 40 chart and was certified platinum, with sales to date recorded at 50,695.

Chart performance

Singles
 "Vinegar", the lead single from the album initially debuted at number five on the Finnish singles chart. However, it rose to number one in its third week, a position it held for three non-consecutive weeks. In total it spent nineteen weeks on the chart (thirteen of which were in the top five) and is to date Abreu's most successful single. It is ranked as the eighty-eighth best-selling single in Finnish chart history and was certified platinum for sales of over 10,000 copies.
 "Silent Despair" was released as the second single and it too preceded the album. It received a limited physical release and as a result did not chart on the official singles list. However it did reach number twenty-five on the digital chart and like its predecessor, was accompanied by a music video. It garnered strong radio airplay and reached number two on the Airplay Chart.
 "Something About U", the third single from the album was released only to promote the album and did not appear on either the singles or digital charts, although it did garner radio airplay.
 "Come Undone", the fourth and final single from the album was also released only for promotional purposes.

Track listing

Promotion

From 2008 to 2009, Abreu promoted her sophomore album with the Now Tour throughout Finland.

Setlist

Tour dates

References

2008 albums
Anna Abreu albums